Simmons Point Station is the name of a house near the unincorporated settlement of Globe in Marion Township, Douglas County, Kansas. The building was constructed in the 1880s as a way station for travelers on the Santa Fe Trail, and it was run by Phillip and Elmira Dodder Simmons.

In 1995, the United States National Park Service certified the house as a historic site. However, no settlement in the area claimed the building, causing it to fall into disrepair. Today, it is in an advanced state of deterioration and nearing collapse.

References

Buildings and structures in Douglas County, Kansas
Santa Fe Trail
Unused buildings in Kansas